Marikollen is a ski jumping hill located at Rælingen in Akershus, Norway. It is the site of Marikollen skisenter which was opened in 1959 and is owned by Rælingen Skiklubb. There is an alpine ski slope, ski jump and  sledding facility. The facility hosted one FIS Ski jumping World Cup event in 1987. Fredrik  Bjerkeengen holds the ski slope record.

World Cup

Men

References

External links
Marikollen skisenter website

Ski jumping venues in Norway
Sport in Akershus
Sports venues completed in 1959
Rælingen